This is an incomplete list of Statutory Instruments of the United Kingdom in 1958. This listing is the complete, 40 items, "Partial Dataset" as listed on www.legislation.gov.uk (as at March 2014).

Statutory Instruments
The Small Ground Vermin Traps Order 1958 SI 1958/ 24
The Work in Compressed Air Special Regulations, 1958 SI 1958/ 61
The Reciprocal Enforcement of Judgments (Pakistan) Order 1958 SI 1958/141
The Conveyance of Explosives Byelaws 1958 Explosives SI 1958/230
The Superannuation (Fire Brigade and other Local Government Service) Interchange (Amendment) Rules 1958 SI 1958/361
The Agriculture (Avoidance of Accidents to Children ) Regulations 1958 SI 1958/366
The Reciprocal Enforcement of Judgments (India) Order 1958 SI 1958/425
The Dark Smoke (Permitted Periods) Regulations 1958 SI 1958/498
The Imported Livestock Order, 1958 SI 1958/558
The National Insurance and Industrial Injuries (France) Order 1958 SI 1958/597
The Central Banks (Income Tax Schedule C Exemption) Order 1958 SI 1958/598
The Fire Services (Pensionable Employment) Regulations 1958 SI 1958/640
The Family Allowances, National Insurance and Industrial Injuries (Belgium) Order 1958 SI 1958/ 771
The Dark Smoke (Permitted Periods) (Vessels) Regulations 1958 SI 1958/ 878
The Petroleum-Spirit (Conveyance by Road) Regulations, 1958 SI 1958/ 962
The Copyright (International Organisations) (Amendment) Order 1958 SI 1958/1052
The Government Annuities Payment Regulations 1958 SI 1958/1181
The National Insurance (New Entrants Transitional) Amendment Regulations 1958 SI 1958/1239
The Visiting Forces (Designation) (Malta) Order 1958 SI 1958/1261
The Visiting Forces (Designation) (Colonies) (Amendment) Order 1958 SI 1958/1262
The Family Allowances, National Insurance and Industrial Injuries (Yugoslavia) Order 1958 SI 1958/1263
The Central Banks (Income Tax Schedule C Exemption) (No. 2) Order 1958 SI 1958/1265
The Chequers Estate (Appointed Day) Orders, 1958 SI 1958/1352
Cinematograph (Safety) Regulations 1958 SI 1958/1530
The Opencast Coal (Notice of Work) Regulations 1958 SI 1958/1649
The General Claims Tribunal (Transfer Date) Order, 1958 SI 1958/1752
The Import Duty Reliefs (Administration) Order 1958 SI 1958/1965
The Foreign Compensation Commission (Amendment) Rules, Approval Instrument 1958 SI 1958/1995
The Whaling Industry (Ship) (Amendment) Regulations 1958 SI 1958/2042
The Matrimonial Causes (Property and Maintenance) Act (Commencement) Order 1958 SI 1958/2080
The Maintenance Orders Act, 1958 (Commencement) Order, 1958 SI 1958/2111
The Opencast Coal (Notice of Record) Regulations 1958 SI 1958/2121
The National Insurance (New Entrants Transitional) Amendment (No. 2) Regulations 1958 SI 1958/2124
The British Wool Marketing Scheme (Amendment) Order 1958 SI 1958/2125
The British Wool Marketing Scheme (Directions) Order 1958 SI 1958/2126
The Superannuation (English Local Government and Northern Ireland) Interchange (Amendment) Rules 1958 SI 1958/2136
The Coast Protection (Variation of Excluded Waters) Regulations 1958 SI 1958/2146
The Slaughter of Animals (Prevention of Cruelty) Regulations 1958 SI 1958/2166
The Pensions Commutation Payment Regulations 1958 SI 1958/2195
The Land Powers (Defence) Act (Inquiries) Rules 1958 SI 1958/2231

Unreferenced Listings
The following 8 items were previously listed on this article, however are unreferenced on the authorities site, included here for a "no loss" approach.
Explosives (Fees for Importation) Order 1958 SI 1958/136 
Dragonby Ironstone Mine (Diesel, Diesel-Electric and Storage Battery Vehicles) Special Regulations 1958 SI 1958/320 
Winn's Ironstone Mine (Diesel, Diesel-Electric and Storage Battery Vehicles) Special Regulations 1958 SI 1958/321 
Meters (Permitted Alterations) Order 1958  SI 1958/1061
Silverwood Mine (Electric Trolley Locomotives) Special Regulations 1958  SI 1958/1276
Sheffield Water Order 1958  SI 1958/1383
Act of Sederunt (Legal Aid Rules) 1958  SI 1958/1872
Singapore (Constitution) Order in Council 1958 SI 1958/1946

References

External links
Legislation.gov.uk delivered by the UK National Archive
UK SI's on legislation.gov.uk
UK Draft SI's on legislation.gov.uk

See also
List of Statutory Instruments of the United Kingdom

Lists of Statutory Instruments of the United Kingdom
Statutory Instruments